Korenita is a town in the municipality of Loznica, Serbia. According to the 2002 census, the town has a population of 2680 people. Korenita is situated nearby to Tomanici.

References

Populated places in Mačva District